The Neville House is a historic brick townhouse in Mobile, Alabama, United States.  It was built in 1896, in an Italianate-influenced style. The building was placed on the National Register of Historic Places on January 5, 1984.

References

National Register of Historic Places in Mobile, Alabama
Houses on the National Register of Historic Places in Alabama
Houses in Mobile, Alabama
Italianate architecture in Alabama
Houses completed in 1896